Boiga tanahjampeana is a species of snake of the family Colubridae.

Geographic range
The snake is found in Indonesia.

References 

Snakes of Asia
Reptiles described in 2002
Reptiles of Sulawesi
tanahjampeana